Moon Over Burma is a 1940 American adventure film directed by Louis King and written by Harry Clork, Wilson Collison, W.P. Lipscomb and Frank Wead. The film stars Dorothy Lamour, Robert Preston, Preston Foster, Doris Nolan, Albert Bassermann, Frederick Worlock and Addison Richards. The film was released on December 11, 1940, by Paramount Pictures.

Plot
The managers of a teak lumber camp in Burma compete for the affections of a beautiful American entertainer who gets stranded in Rangoon.

Cast
 Dorothy Lamour as Arla Dean
 Robert Preston as Chuck Lane
 Preston Foster as Bill Gordon
 Doris Nolan as Cynthia Harmon
 Albert Bassermann as Basil Renner
 Frederick Worlock as Stephen Harmon
 Addison Richards as Art Bryan
 Harry Allen as Sunshine
 Frank Lackteen as Khran
 Stanley Price as Khuda

References

External links 
 

1940 films
American adventure films
1940 adventure films
Paramount Pictures films
Films directed by Louis King
Films set in Myanmar
American black-and-white films
1940s English-language films
1940s American films